Ayoola Oladapo Agboola also known as KDDO (and formerly as Kiddominant) is a Nigerian recording producer, songwriter, and artist. He's best known for producing Afrobeats longest charting billboard single "Fall" by Davido, which peaked on US R&B/Hip-Hop Airplay chart at number 13 and US Hot R&B Songs chart at number 25 on Billboard. According to OkayAfrica, Fall is Nigeria's longest-charted pop song in Billboard history and Pitchfork named it among the best 200 song of the decade. In 2017, he was part of Pulse Nigeria top 10 record producers to focus on. In 2020, Kiddominant became the first Afrobeats producer in history to be certified by the recording industry association of America, after fall became a certified gold record in the US. KDDO is managed by Cameron Penney at Pentlife Music.

Early life and education
He was born and raised in Lagos State, Nigeria. He is an alumnus of Redeemer's University, where he studied actuarial science.

Music career
In an interview with The Hundreds in 2016, he talked about his life and growing up in Lagos, noting how it has influenced him and his music. He also talked about his journey so far and how he started out as a DJ at age 14, and described his style of production:
Kiddominant's musical influences include Fela Kuti, Timbaland, Sade Adu and Polow da Don. On March 23, 2017, he is signed to Sony/ATV Music Publishing as a record producer and a songwriter.

In 2018, Kiddominant became the first platinum-selling Nigerian record producer to be certified by RISA . He was certified for his production work's on "Fall" and "Fela in Versace" after they both sold over 20,000 unit of it records in South Africa.

In 2019, he was featured alongside Davido in Chris Brown's album tilted "Indigo Extended", he co-wrote and produced "Under the Influence".

Productions
Kiddominant has worked with several artistes including Davido, Wizkid, Popcaan, Wale, Mike Will Made It, DJ Neptune, Aka, DJ Maphorisa, Mr Eazi, Mayorkun and Orezi. His production hits include "Lower Body" and "Under the Influence" by Chris Brown and D&G By Davido and Summer Walker, "The Money (feat. Olamide ) by Davido", "Marry (feat. Mr Eazi)" by DJ Neptune, "Fall" by Davido, "Mama" by Mayorkun and "Fela in Versace" by Aka.

On April 17, 2019, Davido  shared a news on Instagram according to him. He said; Kiddominant made it to Beyoncé album "B7". He leaked the track name co-produced by Kiddominant "Nefertiti" featuring Rihanna.  In 2018, Beyoncé unofficial album "B7" was reportedly leaked on Spotify in November 2018. And according to Kathryn Lindsay of Refinery29 media, she wrote as quote "B7 rumored album appeared on Spotify and it consists of fourteen songs with features from Wizkid, Normani, SZA, Blue Ivy" and a lot more.

Tours
On July 12, 2017, Kiddominant kicked off his first tour "L.O.U.D Music Production Tour" which took place in 9 states including Abuja, Lagos State, Enugu, Port Harcourt, Johannesburg, Cape Town, Nairobi, Accra and Addis Ababa supported by Sony ATV and Davido Music Worldwide.

Notable performances
Kiddominant shared the stage with "Mayorkun" at the Mayor Of Lagos Concert held in December 2017, alongside Davido being the hype man on stage. In 2018, AKA and Kiddominant performed at FNB Stadium during AFCON qualifiers match between Nigeria and South Africa.

Discography

Accolades

References 

Living people
Nigerian record producers
21st-century Nigerian musicians
Nigerian DJs
Redeemer's University Nigeria alumni
1992 births